Visa requirements for Ghanaian citizens are administrative entry restrictions by the authorities of other states placed on citizens of Ghana. As of 2 July 2019, Ghanaian citizens had visa-free or visa on arrival access to 64 countries and territories, ranking the Ghanaian passport 80th in terms of travel freedom (tied with passports from Philippines and Zimbabwe) according to the Henley Passport Index.


Visa requirements map

Visa requirements

Dependent, Disputed, or Restricted territories
Unrecognized or partially recognized countries

Dependent and autonomous territories

See also

 Visa policy of Ghana
 Ghanaian passport
 Tourism in Ghana
 Foreign relations of Ghana

References and Notes
References

Notes

Ghana
Foreign relations of Ghana